The Ballincollig Royal Gunpowder Mills was one of three Royal gunpowder mills that manufactured gunpowder for the British Government. Located in Ballincollig, Cork city, Ireland, largely in what is now the Ballincollig Regional Park, the powder mills were originally opened in 1794 as a private enterprise, before being taken over by the British Government during the Napoleonic Wars.

The mills returned for a time to private ownership in the mid-19th century, before closing permanently in 1903. In the late 20th century Cork County Council bought the mill grounds, developed a public park and opened a visitor centre. Though the visitor centre closed in 2002, many of the mill buildings remain accessible in the public park.

Operational history (1794 – 1903)

Background 
Prior to the formation of the Royal Gunpowder Mills, gunpowder production was centered in Dublin on tributaries to the Liffey, in particular the River Carmac where three gunpowder factories had been established in the late 18th century.

Formation 
The gunpowder mills were first established in Ballincollig in 1794, by Corkman Charles Henry Leslie alongside his silent partner John Travers, trading under the name of Leslie, Travers and Company, Royal Irish Gunpowder Mills. He chose Ballincollig as a site for the gunpowder factory for several reasons: from a safety perspective, it was relatively remote at the time, far from any well-populated areas; on the other hand, it was close enough to Cork city to avail of its port to facilitate the importation of the raw materials required for the production of gunpowder.  Furthermore, its location in a flat valley and its water-power potential influenced Leslie's choice of Balincollig as the ideal site. Leslie built a weir to produce a head of water and a canal, one and a half miles long which was fed by the River Lee and which powered his two mills at the eastern end of the site. For the first twenty years following their construction, the mills were the largest in Ireland.

Following the 1798 Rebellion and the emerging threat from Napoleon, the British government deemed it vital to seek out a monopoly on gunpowder production in Ireland. In 1804, Leslie bought out Travers' share of the mills, and either in that same year or in 1805, he sold the mills on a lease of 999 years to the British Board of Ordnance for a sum of IR£30,000. To meet the demands of the British Army, during the Napoleonic Wars the mill site was expanded tenfold and twelve new mills were added to the complex as well as new processing buildings and homes for the workers and senior officials. To improve security, a barracks was constructed in 1810, and military escorts were arranged to accompany the wagons of powder to Cork Harbour. The site covered , and was enclosed by a high limestone wall.

After the Napoleonic Wars, the demand for gunpowder fell dramatically and the mills were closed in 1815. The Duke of Wellington ordered "The whole of the wooden part of the manufactory to be taken down (and) the foundations to be preserved". The machinery was oiled, painted and maintained. Some of the equipment was put up for auction in 1831 and soon many of the buildings were in dilapidated state.

Re-opening as a private company 
By 1834 the mill complex had been taken over by Sir John Tobin and Company of Liverpool. Tobin and his partner Charles Horsfall transformed the mills into one of the most up to date industries in the country.

Within a few months the complex was being renovated and workers were employed at clearing out the disused waterways. By mid-1835 at the Ballincollig mills, trading as the Royal Gunpowder Mills Company, had commenced the manufacture and the weekly wage bill was almost 200 pounds. Before the end of the 1830s there were about 200 people employed at the mills and the annual production of gunpowder was in the region of 16,000 barrels. To reduce the danger of accidents the various departments were placed at some distance from each other ; materials were transported on small canals which eliminated the hazard of sparks from horses hooves. The quantities of gunpowder exported between 1836 and 1842 were : 1836 – 7,517 casks ; 1837 – 6,267 casks, 1838 – 9,835 casks ; 1839 – 16,045 casks ; 1840 – 13,914 casks ; 1841 – 16,489 casks ; 1842 – 17,738 casks. Having such quantities of gunpowder passing through the city gave cause for alarm and in June 1842 the matter was discussed by the Harbour Board. It was agreed that great caution should be exercised while shipping the material and it was suggested that the shipping point be moved from the navigation wall down river to Rochestown. It was later suggested that new road to be constructed to transport the gunpowder from Ballincollig to Cork, and a plan to build a canal was also suggested.

Corning House explosion 
A fatal accident occurred at the Ballincollig Powder Mills on 25 June 1841, when two men were killed by an explosion in the corning house. Little is known about this incident, but two years later another fatal accident took place. Shortly after reporting for work on Saturday, 29 July 1843, John Carol and Jeremiah Long donned their working clothes and special shoes and went to their place of work at the granulating (corning mill). In the building at the time were 21 barrels, each containing  of gunpowder. One of the men put the machinery in motion and two minutes later a massive explosion rocked Ballincollig. "Slates, timber, lead and stones were thrown to a great distance, not a stone in the mill was left standing; even its foundations were torn up and scattered ; and the only part of the machinery standing is a large metal wheel used in the process of granulating. Carrol and Long were killed instantly, their bodies were cast a considerable distance, and in quite different directions. They were wholly denuded of clothes and presented a shocking appearance – mutilated and scarcely recognizable."

Prior to the accident three troops of the 2nd Dragoon Guards had been inspected by General Sir Octavious Carey in a field near the mill; they had moved to the far end of the parade area just a few minutes before the explosion otherwise the casualty list could have been far greater. At an inquest on the following day a verdict of death by accident was returned.

Just three years later two men were injured when another mill exploded. One man had his clothing burned, the other received a severe back injury when he was hit by flying timber. On 15 April 1847, the military were called in to help contain a fire at the cooperage in the mill complex. Their efforts to prevent the fire spreading to the neighbouring powder store were successful, but the cooperage itself was reduced to ashes. Again, in June 1858, an explosion demolished a small mill in Ballincollig, but no injuries were reported. 

At its peak in Ballincollig in the middle of the 1850s there was over 20 waterwheels – 12 in the composition or incorporating mills, and wheels in the charcoal mill, sawmill, glazing house, and also in the corning and press houses

Serious explosions 
Between 1859 and 1862 three explosions claimed a dozen lives at the Ballincollig Mills. The first of these explosions took place in the dusting house on a Saturday in August 1859. In this building the dust was removed from the gunpowder. Early in the morning the pure gunpowder was removed between 30 and 40 barrels were brought alongside the barge-boat and 20-year-old John Corcoran looked after the barge-horse. The dusting house workers were William Looney, the foreman; Timothy Lyons and James Merrick. As the unloading proceeded, a sudden explosion demolished the dusting house and the adjoining press house; a buttress wall of stone and earth which separated the two timber buildings was also levelled. The five men were killed instantly and the huge crater left by the explosion was soon filled with canal water. Three of the bodies were recovered and brought to a nearby shed; a search commenced for the others.

A more melancholy sight then this could not be imagined, surrounded as if it were relatives of the deceased, bewailing their fate with loud and incessant lamentations; but it was horrible in the extreme to see from time to time persons coming in, bringing in, wrapped in grass or cloth, a blackened cinder that was once a hand, a foot, or other portions of one of the dead men. Those awful relics were scattered far and wide, some of them having been found on the brow of the hill on the opposite side of the river, nearly half a mile away from the scene of the catastrophe.

Nearly two miles at Lisheen House young Morgan O Connel was knocked unconscious by a window which was displaced by the blast. The cause of the explosion was a mystery and it was surmised that friction between barrels or a spark from a pebble was to blame. A verdict of accidental death was returned by the jury.

The tragedy was soon forgotten and a new 'pressing mill' was constructed on the site. The hydraulic equipment for working the machinery was situated under the floor and, as an added safety precaution the floor itself was covered in leather. Shortly before noon on 23 October 1861, the building was cleared and eight barrels of powder and eight barrels of dust were brought in for processing. Twenty minutes later an explosion was heard and when workers arrived at the scene little of the building or its contents remained. Five men who were working in the mill died in the explosion; they were; Owen Begley, the foreman, Thomas Long, George Davidson, Thomas Hailey and Timothy Merrick. A verdict of death by accident was also returned in this case. But a couple of days later it emerged that one of the men who was retiring because of ill health had decided to treat his companions. He had crossed the river and purchased drink which he brought to the mill. The Cork Examiner noted: It is a fearful warning as to the consequences of yielding to a momentary temptation, while on the other hand it is in a certain degree satisfactory for the sake of those engaged in similar operations, to know that the catastrophe arose from causes which are avoidable and that it would probably never occurred had the unhappy victims but adhered to the rules of the establishment.

The third fatal accident occurred in the drying house or 'west stove', almost exactly 12 months later, on 25 October 1862. Thirty barrels of gunpowder exploded and the small building was "blown utterly to pieces, leaving not a trace of its existence save a few beams, sticks and stones on the ground" John Hallissy and David Leahy were killed by falling rubble.

More explosions 
During the next few years further explosions took place. On 22 January 1864 a blast at one of the composition mills caused a chain reaction which blew up 3 other mills. About  of gunpowder was involved, little serious damage was caused and three of the mills were expected to be operational within a few days. Again, on 8 October 1869. three compounding sheds were destroyed in an explosion the material was in an unfinished state and little damage resulted. Two more sheds at the 'Black Mills' were demolished in an explosion in June 1870; only "a few fragments of timber and debris of stone work discoloured by the powder remained to mark what had existed". Following an explosion at the Black Mills in April 1872, a man named John Corcoran died. His companion, 70-year-old William Dinan was severely injured in the blast. Three months later an explosion demolished another shed at the Black Mills. In March 1877 an explosion occurred at the incorporating mill and Thade Connel received severe burns. In this mill, rollers driven by water power moved around a trough and crushed certain ingredients; as a safety precaution – workers were not allowed to remain in the building while the machinery was in motion. The equipment was stopped before workers entered and it was thought that Connel may have been scraping encrusted powder from the roller when the blast occurred. Though hopes were entertained for his recovery, Connel died a few days later.

Ballincollig continued to grow into the middle of the nineteenth century, even while famine raged in other parts of the island. At this time about 500 men and boys were employed and a range of skills were in use in the mills: coopering, mill-wrighting, carpentry as well as other specialist gunpowder making skills. The population of Ballincollig, in 1886, from the Postal Directory of Munster, was 1,130 (including the military).

The powder at this time was largely blasting powder to meet the demands of the construction of new railways, mining and quarrying.

In the latter part of the century, the mills went into decline again as the demand for black gunpowder decreased as new types of explosives such as nitroglycerine were developed.

The mills finally closed in 1903, after the end of the Boer War, with a devastating effect on the local community. Eventually, the site came to be owned by Imperial Chemical Industries (ICI).

Trades
The manufacture of gunpowder involved many skills. The trades mentioned in the board of ordnance list of 1815 included the following: carpenter, cooper, millwright, master mixer, refiners of brimstone (sulphur), charcoal, and saltpetre, press-house, corning house, glazing house, dusting house men, sawyer, shave cleaver.

Coopers

Role and training
Coopering involved the making of barrels or casks of staves that were bound together by hoops of copper or wood. They were fitted with a head and bottom. The barrels were made of oak and had to be fitted extra tight so that dampness would not seep into the powder when it was stored. Copper nails were used. In the late 1830s, around 16,000 barrels of gunpowder were produced each year in Ballincollig. By 1856 there were about 50 coopers and apprentices employed in the mills.

Coopers had to undergo a five-year apprenticeship. The apprentices had to be at least fourteen years of age and to be able to read and write. Their training was governed by the rules of the Cork Coopers Society. They usually worked from 6am to 6pm in summer and from light to dark in winter. In 1887 all boys in the society in the second of their time had to pay 2d (1p) per week until the end of their apprenticeship. Many of the Ballincollig coopers had sons in the trade with them.

Decline
From the 1870s, the number of coopers in the Ballincollig Powder Mills declined. Some of this was due to the decline of production, but some was due to the use of metal canisters to hold powder as the mills changed their production to sporting powders. Some of the decline was also due to the importation of barrels from Royal Arsenal, Woolwich.

After a temporary problem in the summer of 1886, when the mills were closed to the lack of water, there was a general distress in 1889 amongst the powder mill workers, but the coopers were particularly hard hit. "All the coopers are idle for a considerable period; several have gone to England… the remainder…are watching every chance that may turn up to give them employment… but they cannot succeed.

The difficulties the coopers experience lead to industrial trouble. In 1892, the coopers were in dispute with the management over the importation of powder barrels which meant that for the previous 3 months coopers were only able to earn twelve shillings a week.

In 1886, the coopers were again in dispute over the introduction of new machinery which would cut their "already low wages" by 33 per cent. When they refused to accept the managers terms they went out on strike. Eventually, the manager agreed to take back all but three who were regarded as ringleaders, who should be suspended for some time at least as "an example". The company threatened the closure of the cooperage and the use of machine made casks. There was a general decline in coopering in Cork at the end of the last century so that efforts to get the permission of the Cork coopers society to try to find work in the city were in vain.

As a result of the decline in demand for coopering, coopers and their families started to emigrate to England in 1889. Some went to find work in England and Scotland. Others found work elsewhere in Ireland, at least temporarily. In 1886 the Cork Coopers were not pleased when they heard that Ballincollig coopers had found work in Limerick. When the Powder Mills finally closed in June 1903, coopers still appealed to the coopers society to allow them to find work in Cork City, but the society refused.

Manufacturing hazards

During the nineteenth century the manufacture of gunpowder at Ballincollig, and its transportation through Cork City, caused much concern and some fatal accidents. From the opening years of the century the hazards associated with transporting such a hazardous substance through busy streets were evident.

A number of accidents occurred in the mills early in the century. On 10 November 1803, two barrels of gunpowder exploded in the processing shed and five men perished in the blast. Five years later, on 25 August 1808 a "dreadful explosion" at the mill claimed further lives. The shock waves from both of these blasts were felt in Cork. But the city itself also experienced the dangers associated with gunpowder.

Dangers in the city

In November 1810, Ballincollig gunpowder was associated with a major disaster in Cork city itself. At about 10 o'clock on the evening of 3 November a violent explosion rocked the Brandy Lane area of the city, with three houses demolished and a number of others set on fire. Crowds of people converged on the area. A scene of chaos awaited them ; dismembered bodies, clothing, household furniture and ware, plus other debris, were strewn around. Parties were organised to comfort survivors, fight fires and carry out other tasks. Rescuers worked through the night, and by morning 19 bodies had been pulled from the ruins. The deaths of three survivors in hospital brought the number of fatalities to 22. The cause of the tragedy was ascribed to the pilfering of gunpowder from the Ballincollig Mill. A worker had found a market for the powder in quarries near the city and each evening he brought small quantities to his home in Brandy Lane. It surmised that carelessness while drying the powder with candles was the cause of the explosion.

Heritage and community development (1974 – present) 

The mills closed in 1903 after the end of the Boer War and the site came to be owned by Imperial Chemical Industries (ICI). In 1974, Cork County Council bought the land from ICI.

The weir, constructed by Leslie when the mills first opened, collapsed in December 2014. The site surrounding the weir had become a popular swimming location, but following its collapse the current has flowed much more quickly, and several people have drowned or almost drowned in the waters close to the weir. It has been proposed that the Office of Public Works may intervene in the restoration of the weir.

Some of the site (at the Innishmore end) was used for community development. The rest of the site was developed into a regional park. The canals were cleaned out and bridges built and greenery cleared off the surviving buildings. With the aid of a European Community grant, the County Council opened a Heritage Centre in the incorporating mills area in 1993 and a working mill was reconstructed. However, in 2002, the Centre closed on financial grounds. In 2022, the restored incorporating mill (pictured) was burnt down by vandals.

See also
 Eleutherian Mills
 Faversham explosives industry
 Waltham Abbey Royal Gunpowder Mills

References

Notes

Sources

External links

 The Ballincollig Gunpowder Trails (Cork County Council)

Buildings and structures in County Cork
Government munitions production in the United Kingdom
Watermills in the Republic of Ireland
Gunpowder mills
Tourist attractions in County Cork
Parks in County Cork
1794 establishments in Ireland